Scopula campbelli is a moth of the family Geometridae. It was described by Prout in 1920. It is found in southern India.

References

Moths described in 1920
Moths of Asia
campbelli
Taxa named by Louis Beethoven Prout